The 2005 Tour of the Basque Country was the 45th edition of the Tour of the Basque Country cycle race and was held from 4 April to 8 April 2005. The race started in Zarautz and finished with an individual time trial in Oñati. The race was won by Danilo Di Luca of the  team.

Stages

Stage 1
4 April 2005 - Zarautz,

Stage 2
5 April 2005 - Zarautz to Trapagaran,

Stage 3
6 April 2005 - Ortuella to Gasteiz,

Stage 4
7 April 2005 - Gasteiz to Alsasua,

Stage 5a
8 April 2005 - Alsasua to Arantzazu,

Stage 5b
8 April 2005 - Oñati,  (ITT)

General standings

Mountains classification

Points classification

Best team

References

External links
Race website

2005
Tour of the Basque Country
Bas